The Lunuganga Estate was the country house of the renowned Sri Lankan architect Geoffrey Bawa.

The estate had been used as a cinnamon estate during the Dutch era and then a rubber plantation under the British. In 1948, the small house in the estate was given on rent to the local tax collector. In 1949 newly qualified lawyer Geoffrey Bawa bought it from its owner intending to convert the estate bungalow into a weekend house and create a tropical version of a European renaissance garden. The  property is located on the banks of the Dedduwa Lake, in Bentota. Bawa named the estate Lunuganga, which in Sinhala means Salt River. Recognising his lack of architectural knowledge Bawa returned to England to study architecture. After qualifying as an architect he returning to Ceylon in 1958 and joined the architectural practice of Edwards, Reid and Beggs. 

Bawa continued to develop the house and gardens at Lunuganga for forty years, until his death in May 2003. Bawa was cremated on the Cinnamon Hill and ashes buried there.

The house and gardens contain many works from artists such as Donald Friend and Laki Senanayake as well as artifacts from Asia and Europe. 

Since Bawa's death in 2003, Lunuganga has been managed by a group of his close friends, who form the Lunuganga Trust. The gardens are now open to the public and the buildings on the estate are run as a seasonal country house hotel.

See also
Geoffrey Bawa

References

Country houses in Sri Lanka
Geoffrey Bawa buildings